Morton Hill may refer to:

People
Morton A. Hill (1917–1985), American clergyman and anti-pornography activist
Morton Charles Hill (1936–2021), American diplomat

Places
Morton Hill (New York), a mountain in the Catskill Mountains in New York state
Morton on the Hill, a civil parish in the English county of Norfolk

See also
Hillmorton, a suburb of Rugby, Warwickshire, England
Hillmorton, New Zealand, a suburb of south-western Christchurch